São Rafael is a district in the subprefecture of São Mateus in the city of São Paulo, Brazil.

References 

Districts of São Paulo